Funapide (INN) (former developmental code names TV-45070 and XEN402) is a novel analgesic under development by Xenon Pharmaceuticals (formerly in partnership with Teva Pharmaceutical Industries) for the treatment of a variety of chronic pain conditions, including osteoarthritis, neuropathic pain, postherpetic neuralgia, and erythromelalgia, as well as dental pain. It acts as a small-molecule Nav1.7 and Nav1.8 voltage-gated sodium channel blocker. Funapide is being evaluated in humans in both oral and topical formulations, and as of July 2014, has reached phase IIb clinical trials.

See also 
 List of investigational analgesics

References

External links 
 Funapide - AdisInsight

Analgesics
Benzodioxoles
Furans
Local anesthetics
Trifluoromethyl compounds
Sodium channel blockers
Spiro compounds